Halorhodospira is a Gram-negative genus of bacteria from the family of Ectothiorhodospiraceae. Halorhodospira bacteria occur in hypersaline and extreme saline habitats.

References

Chromatiales
Bacteria genera
Taxa described in 1997